Luis Alfonso Páez (born October 27, 1986) is a Colombian footballer who plays as a forward for Boyacá Chicó.

Career 
Paez began his career in the Categoría Primera B with Atlético Bello. A year later, he transferred to Millonarios, and the following year to Deportivo Rionegro, which later merged into Rionegro Águilas, the club where he won his first title in 2010. In 2011, he joined Atlético Junior, where he had some of the best periods of his career, scoring 37 goals in 64 games, and winning the league title in 2011. In 2017, he left Rionegro and moved to India to play for NorthEast United FC, and in 2018 he signed for Deportivo Táchira from Venezuela.

Honours

Club
Rionegro Águilas
Categoría Primera B (1): 2010
Atlético Junior
Categoría Primera A (1): 2011-II
Atlético Nacional
Categoría Primera A (1): 2014-I

External links

1986 births
Living people
Footballers from Medellín
Association football forwards
Colombian footballers
Colombian expatriate footballers
Categoría Primera A players
Categoría Primera B players
Indian Super League players
Venezuelan Primera División players
Liga Nacional de Fútbol de Guatemala players
Atlético Bello footballers
Millonarios F.C. players
Águilas Doradas Rionegro players
Atlético Junior footballers
Deportivo Pasto footballers
Atlético Huila footballers
Atlético Nacional footballers
Independiente Santa Fe footballers
NorthEast United FC players
Deportivo Táchira F.C. players
Boyacá Chicó F.C. footballers
Expatriate footballers in India
Expatriate footballers in Venezuela
Expatriate footballers in Guatemala
Colombian expatriate sportspeople in India